National parks in Panama include:

National parks 

Altos de Campana National Park
Barro Colorado Island
Cerro Hoya National Park
Chagres National Park
Coiba National Park
Darién National Park
Omar Torrijos "El Cope" National Park
Golfo de Chiriquí National Park
Isla Bastimentos National Marine Park
La Amistad International Park
Las Cruces Trail National Park
Metropolitan National Park
Portobelo National Park
Sarigua National Park
Soberanía National Park
Volcan Baru National Park

See also
Protected areas of Panama

References

Panama
 List
National parks